Dark Shadows: London's Burning is a Big Finish Productions original dramatic reading based on the long-running American horror soap opera series Dark Shadows.

Plot 
London, 1906: Quentin investigates how music hall star Rosie Faye is connected to a series of cases of spontaneous human combustion.

Cast
Quentin Collins – David Selby
Rosie Faye – Louise Jameson

External links
Dark Shadows - London's Burning

Dark Shadows audio plays
2010 audio plays
Spontaneous human combustion in fiction